General Nicholas Joseph "Nick" Fury is a fictional character appearing in comic books published by Marvel Comics' Ultimate Marvel section as a different version of Nick Fury. He has a substantial presence in all the Ultimate Marvel comics, appearing first in Ultimate Marvel Team-Up and Ultimate X-Men and later reappearing regularly in Ultimate Spider-Man and finally securing a regular, recurring role as the general of S.H.I.E.L.D. and the leader of the Ultimates, a re-imagining of the Avengers. This character was designed to look like Samuel L. Jackson, who later went on to portray the character in the Marvel Cinematic Universe; the recognizability of the MCU version later led Marvel to retire the original Earth-616 character with his son.

Publication history

Ultimate Nick Fury first appeared in Ultimate Marvel Team-Up #5 (2001), where he was drawn as a younger version of the original iteration of the character. His clothing integrated high-tech capabilities such as invisibility and shoes capable of flight.

In 2002, the character had a starring role in The Ultimates, where artist Bryan Hitch redesigned him to look like actor Samuel L. Jackson. The similarity is noted within the story.

Fictional character biography

Origins
Nicholas Fury fought for the United States in World War II. During the invasion of Sicily, he, along with Private Fisk (the grandfather of Wilson Fisk) and Canadian paratrooper Corporal Howlett, attempted to loot a house. American military police arrived to arrest them, and all three were subdued. Fisk was grazed by a bullet, while Fury was imprisoned in an unknown location alongside several other black men, and Howlett, despite protests that he was Canadian, was also shipped to an unknown location. Fury was selected to be the next test subject for Project: Rebirth, as his blood work most closely matched that of Subject #22, the most successful of the previous test subjects. He was injected with a serum that gave him super-strength, which he used to free himself and the other prisoners, who then escaped. The scientists who were working on him let him escape, deciding that they have all the information that they needed for now.

After attending college in India, Fury enlisted in the U.S. military, where he was deployed into various conflicts such as the Kosovo War. He was later assigned to S.H.I.E.L.D.'s Weapon X program in the original Gulf War. While transporting the mind wiped Wolverine in an adamantium cage, an Iraqi guerrilla ambushed and killed his team, inadvertently freeing Wolverine from his prison. After slaughtering the Iraqi guards, Wolverine discovered Fury, the only survivor of the ambush, and transported him back through the desert to the Allied forces. Although Wolverine was summarily subdued and re-imprisoned by his handlers, a bond between the two men was formed. The next day, Fury, already mostly healed, was confronted by General Thaddeus Ross. The General had discovered much was unusual about Fury and questioned him at length, prompting him to reexamine where he was going in life.

Director of S.H.I.E.L.D. and Ultimates
Years later, the X-Men were abducted and imprisoned by the Weapon X program. This program was overseen at the time by Wraith, who had previously staged a coup against General Ross. This coup had prevented Ross from dismantling the Weapon X program altogether. Wolverine, the only X-Man who eludes capture, later asks Fury for help in freeing the other X-Men and bringing down the Weapon X program. During the operation, which also involves the Brotherhood of Mutants, Wraith was about to kill Nightcrawler, but was shot dead by Fury.

Fury is summarily promoted to General and resumes the duties of the Director of S.H.I.E.L.D. He was tasked with forming a team to battle posthuman threats and resurrecting the Super-Soldier program, two objectives that resulted in the formation of the Ultimates. Fury operates as the commander of the team, at times leading them into action, though he often shares duties with the revived World War II hero Captain America and billionaire genius Iron Man. Nick Fury is also responsible for monitoring superhumans who are not affiliated with the U.S. Military, including Peter Parker and the X-Men.

Nick Fury lost his right arm in a battle against the Liberators in The Ultimates 2. He replaced it shortly thereafter with a bionic one.

Ultimate Spider-Man
Nick Fury has also been involved in the Ultimate Spider-Man comics. In them, he meets Peter after Norman Osborn returns. He states that S.H.I.E.L.D. was able to figure out who Peter was because of the security shots of the OZ Spider biting Peter, as well as Dr. Octopus screaming that Peter Parker is Spider-Man while in jail. Nick Fury has been watching Peter and informs him that, due to his illegal genetically altered status, he will become the property of S.H.I.E.L.D. when he turns eighteen. Although Fury wants him to be part of the Ultimates, this may have changed because the Ultimates broke apart. Peter and Fury's relationship became strained after the Hobgoblin arc. Peter punches Fury for ignoring his questions for why Harry Osborn became the Hobgoblin. At that point, Fury told one of his scientists that he wanted to know everything about OZ and that it was time for Peter Parker to lose his spider powers. This follows on to the Ultimate Clone Saga, in which it is revealed by Fury that the Tinkerer's Spider-Slayers were developed to handle Peter if and when he ever went insane. Mary Jane Watson, upon discovering Fury's intentions, tells him that Peter looks up to him like a father. This convinced Fury to let Peter keep his powers, and he apologizes to Peter, stating that in his line of work he's been trained to expect someone in Peter's position to crack under stress.

Ultimate Power
During Ultimate Power, Fury was judged to be at least partially responsible for the devastation of much of Earth-31916 along with Emil Burbank. Burbank had sought a means to defeat the Hyperion of that universe. An alien organism, unleashed in an attempt to achieve this, spread throughout the United States, causing widespread devastation. A probe sent by Reed Richards provided evidence that an "invasion from another universe" was responsible. The Squadron Supreme was dispatched to the Ultimate Universe in order to arrest Richards so that he could stand trial for his "crimes". A lengthy battle ensued between the Squadron on one side and the Ultimates, Spider-Man, the X-Men, and the Fantastic Four on the other. Richards, believing himself to be responsible when the Squadron produced his probe as evidence, surrendered himself. Fury was unwilling to accept this and convinced Thor to create a bridge to Earth-31916, through which the Helicarrier was able to travel. Once there, another battle between the Squadron and the Ultimate Universe heroes began. Spider-Man learns that Fury had an ulterior motive - the retrieval of the probes and their data, and had conspired with Doctor Doom to do so. In addition, Fury had brought insurance in the form of the Hulk. It took the combined power of the Ultimate Universe heroes, the Earth-31916 Squadron Supreme, and their counterparts from Earth-712 to defeat the Hulk, but Doom had proven to be simply a Doombot. To stop the fighting, the Ultimates agreed to turn over Fury to the Earth-31916 Squadron and to allow Power Princess to return with them to their universe. Fury tries to convince them that they are making a mistake, but his pleas are ignored.

Fury is seen still stranded in Earth-31916 in Squadron Supreme (Vol. 2) #1. He has apparently fulfilled the prophecy made by Hyperion in Ultimate Power #9: "Given the strength of our military industrial complex, Fury would have risen here to even greater heights than your homeworld."

Ultimatum
Fury returns to the Ultimate Universe in Ultimatum #4 and is instrumental in defeating Magneto. Jean Grey telepathically relays the information discovered by Fury in Ultimate Origins that mutants are not the next stage in human evolution, but are in fact the result of experimentation done by humans. This revelation causes Magneto to reverse the damage done to the Earth's magnetic poles.

Following the events of Ultimatum, Fury is informed by Hawkeye about how Captain America discovered the secret of the Red Skull. Fury asks head of S.H.I.E.L.D. Carol Danvers for permission to start up a "death squad" in order to catch the Red Skull and Cap, which he then carries out with the help of Hawkeye, Gregory Stark, and the rest of the Ultimate Avengers.

Project: Avengers
In Ultimate Comics: Avengers Fury returned to S.H.I.E.L.D. again. After learning that Captain America went rogue after discovering that the Red Skull was his biological son, Fury re-activated "Project Avenger" and recruited a team of questionable super humans to find Captain America. Following Captain America's capture, Fury briefed the Avengers of AIM's purpose of creating the Cosmic Cube to build their visioned utopia and readied his team to thwart the organization's plans.

Fury guided his team of Avengers from headquarters, with the secret intent to go ahead with "Plan B", which is to detonate a nuclear warhead that was built into War Machine's armor by Dr. Gregory Stark in case the mission failed.

Captain America managed to arrive at the location of the battle between the Red Skull and the Avengers and teleported the jet to the exact location where the Red Skull was standing, impaling him through the chest with one of the rods that protrudes from its nose. The Red Skull was taken to a hospital and kept alive long enough for Gail, his mother, to say her goodbyes. Red Skull explained to Fury that all he wanted to do with the Cosmic Cube was turn back time and prevent Steve Rogers from being lost during the war so that he could grow up with him and lead a normal life, rather than the one he was given. Petra Laskov, dressed as a doctor, then entered the room and shot Red Skull in the head, killing him.

A short time later, Fury is fixing his damaged prosthetic arm while speaking with Gregory Stark. Gregory concludes that it was in fact Fury himself who hired the Red Skull to come out of retirement, in some sort of plot to resurrect Project Avengers, securing him a position in S.H.I.E.L.D.'s employment and eventually regaining his old title as Director. Fury told him that was how he got the job the first time, and expects the same outcome this time as well. Fury and his Avengers later faced threats from the Ghost Rider and a vampiric menace. In Ultimate Avengers vs. New Ultimates, Stark would end up framing Fury for selling information to North Korea and stealing his position as S.H.I.E.L.D. Director and charging Fury's ex-assistant Carol Danvers' New Ultimates to apprehend him, ending in a standstill when Stark caught Fury, revealing he was manipulating both. Fury and his Avengers take down Stark's forces with Thor landing a strike from his hammer, killing Gregory. 

In "Ultimate Enemy", approximately six months after Ultimatum, Fury is Black OPS and is "Off the Grid". He was enjoying a meal while under cover when the restaurant he was at was attacked by a creature with energy powers. Fury manages to hold the creature at bay until Spider-Man and Human Torch arrive at the scene to investigate. The creature vanishes after a short battle with the three of them. Peter is surprised to see Fury alive, as he has not seen him for months.

Nick breaks into the Triskelion and confronts Carol Danvers in the ladies' room and points a gun to her head, exclaiming that she is the only person who knew he was alive and would have motive to have him killed. The two fight before being interrupted by a female S.H.I.E.L.D. agent, informing Danvers that an attack has been made in Queens, which Fury knows is where the Parker residence is located. Simultaneously, the two order a Battalion of Hulkbuster agents to get to Queens to intercept the attacker, where they succeed in apprehending the monster attacking superhumans.

Attempting to atone for his mistakes with Peter, Fury has taken on a more direct mentor role for Miles Morales as the new Spider-Man.

When the Peter Parker of Earth-616 is sent to the Ultimate Universe, Fury interrogates him for information about his presence in this universe, accepting Peter's story that he came from another universe as nobody would come up with something that insane as a lie. Peter also notes that Ultimate Nick Fury is a lot cooler than the version Peter knows. Attempting to atone for his mistakes with his Peter, Fury allows the other Peter to visit his counterpart's family, and is satisfied when Peter gives Miles his blessing to become that world's new Spider-Man.

Taking on HYDRA, Formation of the Howling Commandos
Nick joined HYDRA using a bio-camouflage to change his appearance under the name of "Scorpio" (resembling his classic mainstream look), stating that his motivations were to destroy the government that took everything away from him, although he still had a different agenda apart from Hydra's. The Ultimates managed to track him and tried to capture him, believing he was the traitor who provided Hydra with S.H.I.E.L.D. weapons. During an attack to Hydra's Death's Head camp, it was revealed Nick Fury was trying to destroy Hydra from the inside, while the S.H.I.E.L.D. traitor was actually Hydra leader Commander Crimson who used an Infinity Gem to battle her enemies, until a burst of energy made her disappear along with the artifact.

In the aftermath of the battle, Nick told Monica Chang he was planning to create his own team, the Howling Commandos, to battle Hydra the way the Ultimates couldn't, along ex-Hydra agent Abigail Brand. Before leaving, Chang told Fury he would be under her supervision.

Abilities and technologies
Like his Earth-616 counterpart, Nick Fury is an active physical man despite being over 80 years of age. Initially, he was not shown to use the Infinity Formula or other physical enhancements that his mainstream Marvel Universe counterpart possessed. However, Fury was later revealed to have served during World War II and was a test subject of the Super Soldier program (albeit as an unwilling participant). In this reality, the Super Soldier serum not only gave Fury low level super-human strength and agility but has also reduced his aging, allowing Fury to continue to be active despite his advanced chronological age.

Fury has had his right arm replaced with a cybernetic arm that gives him even greater strength than his enhanced biological original. The exact level of his cybernetic arm has not been specifically revealed. Unlike his mainstream counterpart who retains his injured eye despite being legally blind in it with a 95% vision loss, Fury has actually lost his left eye. The skin around the left eye-socket is shown to be badly scarred, extending beyond the eye patch.

Fury is an exceptional combatant and strategist and a gifted field leader. In his earliest appearances, he operated with technology years ahead of traditional forces, including the latest experimental weaponry, and some form of projected invisibility and the ability to walk through solid matter. These powers have very limited windows due to massive expense for any moment of "uptime"; costs for these run to the millions for less than a minute of use. He once used a chewing gum that was programmed to explode after 200 chews. The number of instances in which Fury uses these technologies has decreased since The Ultimates #1, and Fury is shown to primarily use conventional firearms.

While General Fury was Director of S.H.I.E.L.D. he was constantly monitored and shadowed by dozens of S.H.I.E.L.D. agents and all known observation technologies.  After leaving S.H.I.E.L.D., Fury has shown that he knows how to elude all such monitoring devices to the point that he was able to enter the S.H.I.E.L.D helicarrier and attack the current Director Carol Danvers.

In other media

Most appearances of Nick Fury in other media since the 2000s have been modeled on the Ultimate Marvel version of the character, most notably in the Marvel Cinematic Universe where he is portrayed by Samuel L. Jackson.

References

External links
World of Black Heroes: Nick Fury Biography
 

Comics characters introduced in 2001
African-American superheroes
Fictional amputees
Fictional characters missing an eye
Fictional characters with slowed ageing
Marvel Comics cyborgs
Fictional generals
Fictional Gulf War veterans
Fictional military strategists
Fictional spymasters
Fictional special forces personnel
Fictional Vietnam War veterans
Fictional World War II veterans
Fictional Yugoslav War veterans
Superhero film characters
Marvel Comics characters with superhuman strength
Marvel Comics television characters
Ultimate Marvel characters
Characters created by Brian Michael Bendis
S.H.I.E.L.D. agents
Fictional United States Army personnel
Nick Fury